The Tijuana Story is a 1957 American film noir crime film directed by Leslie Kardos.

Plot
A Mexican newspaperman wages a one-man war against a powerful crime syndicate.

Cast
 Rodolfo Acosta as Manuel Acosta Mesa
 James Darren as Mitch
 Robert McQueeney as Eddie March 
 Jean Willes as Liz March
 Joy Stoner as Linda 
 Paul Newlan as Peron Diaz
 George E. Stone as Pino
 Michael Fox as Reuben Galindo
 Robert Blake as Enrique Acosta Mesa
 William Fawcett as Alberto Rodriguez
 Paul Coates as himself - the Narrator

Production
The film was narrated by journalist Paul Coates who broke the original story. It was shot on location in Mexico.

See also
 List of American films of 1957

References

External links
The Tijuana Story at TCMDB
Review of film at Variety

1957 films
American crime films
American crime drama films
Columbia Pictures films
Films set in Tijuana
1957 drama films
1950s English-language films
Films directed by László Kardos
1950s American films